John Joce may refer to:

John Joce (MP for Maldon) (fl.1390-1399)
John Joce (MP for Newcastle-under-Lyme) (fl.1402)